Youghal GAA is a Gaelic Athletic Association club based in the town of Youghal, in County Cork, Ireland. The club fields both Hurling and Gaelic football teams and also has junior camogie and ladies football teams.  The club is a member of Cork GAA and Imokilly divisional board.

History
In 1891 the men of Youghal formed the Youghal GAA Football club (Cumann Luthcleas Gael Eochaill). Spearheaded by W.J. Broderick, John Collins, William Farrell, and Michael Browne as first Secretary, the foundation was laid. Organised Gaelic Football was played in Bill Farrell's Field at Frogmore. The club then transferred to Jimmy Lynch's field up towards the Asylum Cross in 1984, and to Copperalley in 1899. Gaelic handball was also played, but declined in the early-1900s, and was revived in the early-1920s, for a long period of time, when the Garda Barracks, at Catherine Street, had a ball alley.
Hurling began its growth in Youghal in the 1940s. The grounds at Copperalley were owned by a Miss Avis Hilda Bennett, and it wasn't until 1934 that the club was accepted as legal tenants in their own right. The rent was 20 pounds per annum and many members were unhappy with this. Negotiations began in 1966 for the outright purchase of the property and negotiations were finally completed in the early-1970s and the club carried out substantial work and officially re-opened the field on 16 June 1974. The opening ceremony was performed by the then President of Ireland, Erskine Childers.
The next development milestone in the club was on 11 December 1985, when the contract was signed for the purchase of ground, from the Southern Health Board, at Magniers Hill, adjacent to St. Raphaels Hospital. This land was bought for £75,000 collected inside three years. This ground is used daily by the club's schools and under-age players. The second phase of this development is currently underway, with an investment of almost 1 million pounds in developing a third playing field, the fencing in of the property and the building of a community hall.

Club colours
The original club jerseys were a maroon jumper, knitted, with a yellow stripe. The club could not initially afford to purchase jerseys, and so a fundraising "terrier coursing" event was held in Copperalley in 1924. The money raised enabled the club to purchase the first set of jerseys, which were green and gold. They remained the club colours until the 1960s, when the club reverted to the maroon and gold.

Honours
 Cork Senior Hurling Championship (0): (Runners-Up 1972)
 Cork Senior Football Championship (0): (Runners-Up 1914, 1919, 1923)
 Munster Intermediate Club Hurling Championship (1): 2013
 Cork Intermediate Hurling Championship (4): 1955, 1969, 1988, 1993 (Runners-Up 1964, 1968, 1992)
 Cork Intermediate Football Championship  (1): 2000 (Runners-Up 1970)
 Cork Premier Intermediate Hurling Championship (1): 2013 (Runners-Up 2011)
 Cork Junior Football Championship (3): 1905, 1906, 1999
 Cork Senior Hurling League (1): 1980
 Cork Minor Hurling Championship (1): 1944
 Cork Minor A Hurling Championship (1): 2022
 Cork Minor A Football Championship (1): 2000
 Cork Minor B Hurling Championship (1): 1991
 East Cork Junior A Hurling Championship (1): 1952
 East Cork Junior A Football Championship (8): 1940, 1941, 1945, 1952, 1959, 1984, 1999 and 2011

Notable club members

 Christy Cooney - Former president of the GAA
 Daithí Cooney
 Bill Cooper
 Tony Coyne
 Brendan Coleman
 Leigh Desmond
 Noel Gallagher
 Pat Hegarty
 Seánie O'Leary
 Willie Walsh

References

Gaelic games clubs in County Cork
Gaelic football clubs in County Cork
Hurling clubs in County Cork